Victor Marc Nigon (born 11 October 1920 in Metz, France, died 5 July 2015) was a biologist who was first to study the nematode worm Caenorhabditis elegans in the laboratory, with Ellsworth Dougherty, in the 1940s.

Jean-Louis Brun, a student of Nigon, continued experiments on the 'Bergerac' variety of C. elegans.

The specific epithet given to the nematode species Caenorhabditis nigoni is a tribute to Victor Nigon.
Victor Nigon has filed for some patents to protect their inventions, which have already been granted by the United States Patent and Trademark Office (USPTO).

See also 
 History of research on Caenorhabditis elegans

References 

1920 births
2015 deaths
French biologists
Caenorhabditis elegans